Klaus Kotzmann (born 17 January 1960) is a German former fencer. He competed in the individual and team foil events for East Germany at the 1980 Summer Olympics.

References

External links
 

1960 births
Living people
People from Bitterfeld-Wolfen
German male fencers
Olympic fencers of East Germany
Fencers at the 1980 Summer Olympics
Sportspeople from Saxony-Anhalt
20th-century German people